The Communist Party of the Basque Homelands (EHAK; , PCTV) was a communist Basque separatist party in the Basque Country, Spain. The party was outlawed by the Spanish Supreme Court in 2008 after it was judicially proven to be part of Batasuna and, ultimately, ETA.

History

EHAK was legally registered for the first time in 2002 but had no known activity until 2005, remaining inactive during these years. In this year, within weeks of the regional Basque election EHAK suddenly rose to national prominence when it publicly announced that it would assume the program of the banned abertzale lists of Aukera Guztiak and Batasuna. EHAK was then widely considered to be a proxy to circumvent the recent ruling which had outlawed Batasuna. Like Batasuna, their representatives refused to explicitly condemn the ETA attacks, being the only important political party not to do so in the Basque Country and Spain. Batasuna representatives asked their supporters to vote for EHAK, which obtained 150,188 votes (12.5%), entering the Basque Parliament with nine seats.

The People's Party requested that the Spanish government conducted investigations to ban EHAK too, though the initially State Legal Service (Abogacía General del Estado) and the Attorney General's Office (Fiscalía General del Estado) found no evidence to support legal actions against the party.

Outlawing

On 18 September 2008 the party was outlawed by the Spanish Supreme Court. According to the legal inquiry, EHAK was "instrumental in continuing the illegal action designed by ETA/Ekin/Batasuna", rapidly losing its autonomy to replace Batasuna's role in the institutional front of ETA's activities. Batasuna got, via EHAK, 837,000 euros corresponding to the public funding given to political parties with parliamentary representation; with no less than 34 Batasuna members (including some of their top officers) were hired by EHAK and paid with this public funding. In the end, according to the judicial inquiry, EHAK followed Batasuna's instructions to the point that there wasn't any difference.

On 4 August 2009 the judge Baltasar Garzón announced his intention to put a number of PCTV members on trial for ETA membership. Among them were two former Basque parliament deputies Karmele Berasategi and Nekane Erauskin; the party president Juan Carlos Ramos and the two party treasurers Jesús María Aguirre and Sonia Jacinto.

References

External links
 EHAK Official web page

2002 establishments in Spain
2008 disestablishments in Spain
Banned political parties in the Basque Country (autonomous community)
Banned communist parties
Banned secessionist parties
Basque nationalism
Defunct communist parties in the Basque Country (autonomous community)
Defunct nationalist parties in Spain
Left-wing nationalist parties
Political parties disestablished in 2008
Political parties established in 2002
Pro-independence parties